The Samoggia is a river in the Emilia-Romagna region of Italy. The source of the river is in the province of Modena near Zocca. The river flows northeast into the Metropolitan City of Bologna and flows near Bazzano, Crespellano, Piumazzo, Anzola dell'Emilia and San Giovanni in Persiceto before entering the Reno east of Decima. The Samoggia has a tributary called the Lavino that flows into it near San Giovanni in Persiceto.

References

Rivers of the Province of Modena
Rivers of the Province of Bologna
Rivers of Italy